The following lists events that happened during 2014 in the Republic of Croatia.

Incumbents 
 President – Ivo Josipović
 Prime Minister – Zoran Milanović
 Speaker – Josip Leko

Events

May
13 May: Floods spread across the Southeast of Europe.
19 May: 2014 Southeast Europe floods
Around 15,000 people in easternmost parts of Croatia were evacuated from their homes.

August
5 August: Croatian MiG-21 jet crashes 20 km south of Zagreb, with no injuries or fatalities.

September
5 September: First life partnership in Croatia was registered.

October
19 October: Milan Bandić, the mayor of Zagreb, is arrested over charges of corruption.

December
 December 28 -  The Croatian presidential election goes to a run-off between incumbent Ivo Josipović and challenger Kolinda Grabar-Kitarović.

Sport
8 September: Marin Čilić wins the 2014 US Open.

Deaths 
 January 1 – Milan Horvat, conductor
 January 7 – Ivan Ladislav Galeta, multimedia artist
 January 12 – Zdenko Škrabalo, physician and diplomat
 March 4 – Maja Petrin, actress
 April 3 – Jovan Pavlović, Metropolitan of the Serbian Orthodox Church
 May 11 – Martin Špegelj, general
 May 29 – Miljenko Prohaska, composer and conductor
 August 11 – Vladimir Beara, footballer and football manager
 August 28 – Ivan Ivančić, athletics coach
 October 9 – Boris Buzančić, actor and politician
 October 9 – Ana Karić, actress

References

 
Croatia
Years of the 21st century in Croatia
2010s in Croatia
Croatia